The Pateley Playhouse is a small amateur-run theatre in the town of Pateley Bridge in Nidderdale, North Yorkshire, England.

The building was initially a Primitive Methodist Chapel but was abandoned in the late 1930s. It was bought by the Pateley Bridge Dramatic Society, a local group active since 1937, who transformed into a theatre seating 73 people. It saw its first production, a version of When We Are Married by J.B. Priestley, in June 1968.

References

External links
Pateley Bridge Dramatic Society at The Playhouse.

Former churches in North Yorkshire
Theatres in North Yorkshire
Pateley Bridge